Tai'erzhuang District is the southernmost of five districts under the administration of the prefecture-level city of Zaozhuang. The district is located in the south of Shandong Province, China, bordering Jiangsu province to the south.

The district was the site of the Battle of Taierzhuang fought between the armies of the Chinese Kuomintang and Imperial Japan in 1938 during the Second Sino-Japanese War. The site of the battle has been listed as a national monument of the People's Republic of China since 2006 (resolution number 6-981).

Administrative divisions
As 2012, this district is divided to 1 subdistrict and 5 towns.
Subdistricts
Yunhe Subdistrict

Towns

Climate

See also
Battle of Taierzhuang

References

External links
official website

County-level divisions of Shandong